Edo Brunner (born 11 October 1970, Dubbeldam, Netherlands) is a Dutch actor and presenter.

Filmography
 De Baby en de bakfiets (1997) - Willem Slootkant
 Benidorm (1999) - Sammy
 Enigma (1999)
 De Zwarte Meteoor (2000)
 Yes Nurse! No Nurse! (2002) - Bertus
 Feestje (2004) - Bartender
 De Bode (2005) - Kees
 Bonkers (2005) - Meester
 De Griezelbus (2005) - Driver Horrorbus
 Voor een paar knikkers meer (2006) - Fat Bully
 Dennis P. (2007) - Dennis
 Wie is... de Mol? (2008) - as himself
 De Brief voor Sinterklaas (2019) - Huibert Jan

External links
 

1970 births
Living people
Dutch male film actors
People from Dordrecht
21st-century Dutch male actors